Andrew Thomas Johnston (born 18 February 1989) is an English professional golfer who plays on the European Tour. He has one win on the European Tour, which came at the 2016 Open de España. Known affectionately as 'Beef' since his youth, he has carried the nickname into his professional career, and is a popular character amongst the crowd.

Personal life
Johnston, who is of partial Jamaican descent, was born in London in 1989 to a working-class family. His father worked as a bus driver and his mother as a school dinner lady.

He started playing golf at the age of four with his father and siblings in a local chip and putt course, and later joined the North Middlesex Golf Club, which is still his home club today. At 14, he was in The Middlesex Junior Squad, and became a scratch player at 16.

He is married to Jodie Valencia. They have a daughter named Harley Noelle.

Career

Johnston was a successful amateur, representing England boys and the Great Britain and Ireland team in the Jacques Léglise Trophy. He turned professional in 2009 and won for the first time that year on the Jamega Tour. After a 2010 season split between the Jamega Tour, the PGA EuroPro Tour and invites to the Challenge Tour, Johnston enjoyed a breakthrough season in 2011. He played in his first European Tour event at the Alfred Dunhill Championship in South Africa, and qualified for his first major championship, the Open Championship, via local final qualifying at Royal Cinque Ports. Johnston also recorded several good results from invites to the Challenge Tour, including a runner-up spot at the M2M Russian Challenge Cup. That qualified him for the Grand Final, where he finished in a tie for third to jump to 15th in the standings and secure a place on the European Tour for 2012.

Johnston played 20 events in his first season on the European Tour, without being able to make any top-10 result and ultimately failing to retain his tour membership.

In 2013, he was back on the Challenge Tour, where he registered a 5th place at the Finnish Challenge and a 6th place at the Northern Ireland Open Challenge, but failed to gain the European Tour membership by finishing only 68th in the final Order of Merit. At the end of the year, he entered the European Tour Qualifying School; after winning the Second Qualifying Stage at Valle Romano Golf, he again came short finishing 52nd at the final event at the PGA Catalunya Resort.

In 2014, Johnston finally found success in the Challenge Tour by winning two events, the Scottish Hydro Challenge and the Le Vaudreuil Golf Challenge; he ended up winning also the final Order of Merit and regained his European Tour membership.

In his second season on the European Tour Johnston started with a 3rd place at the Alfred Dunhill Championship, but struggled to make other positive results, missing 11 cuts in 25 events. At the end of the season he was able to retain his tour card thanks to a 10th place at the Turkish Airlines Open.

His 2016 started in January with a 4th place at the Qatar Masters, after which Johnston earned his first European Tour win at the 2016 Real Club Valderrama Open de España. He went on to on secure two other top-10 results at the BMW PGA Championship and at the 145th Open Championship, where he enjoyed remarkable popularity for his look, personality and game. After the Open he entered for the first time in his career the top-100 of the Official World Golf Ranking at the 89th place.

In September Johnston entered the Web.com Tour Finals in an attempt to gain a PGA Tour card for 2017; he achieved that at the second event of the series, the Albertsons Boise Open, where he finished 4th. As a result, he got a card for the 2017 PGA Tour.

Professional wins (5)

European Tour wins (1)

European Tour playoff record (0–1)

Challenge Tour wins (2)

Jamega Pro Golf Tour wins (2)
2009 The Warwickshire
2011 The Vale of Glamorgan

Results in major championships

 

CUT = missed the half-way cut
WD = withdrew
"T" indicates a tie for a place

Summary

Most consecutive cuts made – 5 (2016 U.S. Open – 2017 Open Championship)
Longest streak of top-10s – 1

Results in World Golf Championships

"T" = Tied

Team appearances
Amateur
European Boys' Team Championship (representing England): 2007
Jacques Léglise Trophy (representing Great Britain and Ireland): 2007 (winners)

See also
2011 Challenge Tour graduates
2014 Challenge Tour graduates
2016 Web.com Tour Finals graduates

References

External links

English male golfers
European Tour golfers
PGA Tour golfers
Korn Ferry Tour graduates
Golfers from London
English people of Jamaican descent
Living people
1989 births